Purpurne surm (Estonian for Purple Death) is a novel by Estonian author August Gailit. It was first published in 1924.

References

Estonian novels
1924 novels